Sputnik Caledonia (2008) is a novel by Andrew Crumey, for which he won the Northern Rock Foundation Writer’s Award, the UK's largest literary prize at the time. It depicts a Scottish boy who longs to be a spaceman, is transported to a parallel communist Scotland where he takes part in a space mission to a black hole, and returns to the real world in middle age, possibly as a ghost. The novel is in three “Books”, with the central one (set in the alternate world) being longest, predominantly serious in tone, while the outer sections are shorter and more humorous. The title refers to the Russian Sputnik program and the alternative name for Scotland, Caledonia, suggesting the idea of Scotland as a satellite state of the Soviet Union.

Plot

Book One
Robbie Coyle, nine years old at the start of the book, lives in Kenzie in Scotland’s Central Belt in the early 1970s. He dreams of going into space; but because of his father’s anti-American, pro-Soviet views, he wants to be a cosmonaut rather than an astronaut. He picks up an Eastern European radio station called Voice of the Red Star, imagines it to be a telepathic signal from another planet, and begs to be taken there.

Book Two
Nineteen-year-old Robert Coyle lives in the British Democratic Republic – a Communist state founded after the overthrow of Nazi occupation in the “Great Patriotic War” – and has arrived at the Installation, a secret military base in Scotland, to take part in a space mission. A strange new object has been detected in the solar system, believed to be a black hole, and the volunteers are to explore it telepathically. Robert has confused memories of the time before his arrival, and the reader is left guessing the connection between Books One and Two. Perhaps the Robbie of Book One has been transported to the other world as he wished; or perhaps the Robert in Book Two is a “parallel” version of the younger Robbie in Book One. The Installation itself is like a “black hole” in the sense that people arrive from the outside, but nobody ever seems to leave - except perhaps in death.

Book Three
In a present-day recognisable reality, Robbie’s parents from Book One are now pensioners. Their story alternates with that of “the kid”, a runaway 13-year-old obsessed with science fiction stories such as Doctor Who, and with the idea that “in an infinite universe everything is possible”. He meets a middle aged man (“the stranger”) who claims to be a spaceman on a mission. The stranger could be the parallel-world Robert grown older - or a terrorist engaged in identity theft. Resisting logical resolution, the novel reprises and reworks themes that have recurred throughout the course of the book, creating an aesthetic unity that is emotionally ambivalent: a juxtaposition of the comic tone of Book One with the dark pessimism of Book Two.

References

External links
Observer (review)
Guardian (review)
Independent on Sunday (review)
Andrew Crumey's website

English-language literature
2008 British novels
Novels by Andrew Crumey
Novels set in Scotland
Picador (imprint) books